This page outlines key records relating to the West Indies cricket team.

Highest Test innings total

Home 790–3 declared vs. Pakistan Kingston, 1957–58 

Away 692–8 declared vs. England The Oval, 1995

Lowest Test Innings total

Home 47 vs. England Kingston, 2003–04

Away 53 vs. Pakistan Faisalabad, 1986–87

Highest individual Test innings

Home 400* Brian Lara vs. England St. John's,  2003–04

Away 291 Viv Richards vs. England The Oval, 1976

Highest Wicket Stands

Best bowling in an innings

Home
9–95, Jack Noreiga, vs. India, Port of Spain, 1970–71

Away
8–92 Michael Holding, vs. England, The Oval, 1976

Best bowling in a match

Home
11–84 Curtly Ambrose, vs. England, Port of Spain, 1989–1990

Away
14–149 Michael Holding, vs. England, The Oval, 1976

Biggest win Innings and 336 runs, vs. India, Calcutta, 1958–59

Biggest defeat Innings and 237 runs, vs. England, The Oval, 1957

See also
List of Test cricket records

Test